IGSSA typically is an acronym for Independent Girls' Schools Sports Association (or variations) and may refer to:

 Independent Girls' Schools Sporting Association (New South Wales)
 Independent Girls Schools Sports Association (Perth)
 Independent Girls' Schools Sports Association (South Australia)